The Tarsaliini are a tribe of apine bees. They are between 7-13mm long. As of 2015, it only contains its type genus, Tarsalia, which was considered part of the tribe Ancylaini until Engel split it in 2015, he believes the Tarsaliini are more closely related to the Eucerini than the Ancylaini. An Arabian and North African tribe, the Tarsaliini have been observed in Egypt, Sudan, Iran, and the Arabian Peninsula.

References

Bee tribes
Apinae